Dave Paul Kelsheimer is an American swimming coach.  In 2015, Kelsheimer was named an assistant open water swimming-coach for the 2016 United States Olympic Swimming Team.  He is the head coach and CEO of Team Santa Monica in Santa Monica, California. He coached Jordan Wilimovsky on to the 2016 US Olympic Swimming Team. He has coached in the Cayman Islands and Australia prior to coaching in the United States.

References

Year of birth missing (living people)
Living people
American swimming coaches